Fox Terriers are two different breeds of the terrier dog type: the Smooth Fox Terrier and the Wire Fox Terrier. Both of these breeds originated in the 19th century from a handful of dogs who are descended from earlier varieties of British terriers, and are related to other modern white terrier breeds. In addition, a number of breeds have diverged from these two main types of fox terrier and have been recognised separately, including the Jack Russell Terrier, Miniature Fox Terrier and Rat Terrier. The Wire and Smooth Fox Terriers share similar characteristics, the main differences being in the coat and markings. They have been successful in conformation shows, more prominently in America than their homeland.

History
English physician John Caius described the English terrier type in his 1577 work English Dogges. By the 18th century, it was recorded that all terriers were wire haired, and black and tan in colour. The earliest record of any white terrier was a dog named Pitch, who was owned by Colonel Thomas Thornton in 1790. The dog was the subject of a painting by Sawrey Gilpin, who created a portrait of it while it was still alive. An engraving of this painting, made prior to 1810, was accompanied by the text, "It would be necessary to notice Colonel Thorton's terriers if they were only on account of his justly celebrated Pitch, from whom are descended most of the white terriers in the kingdom." Dog writers of the early 20th century suggested that Pitch was a terrier-greyhound cross, which was how the colour was introduced into the breed.

Not much is known of early 19th century breeding practices that came to create the modern Fox Terrier. However it is thought that the Beagle, Old English Bulldog, English Toy Terrier, Pointer and even Dalmatian were all used in the creation and stabilisation of the breed.

From 1870 onwards, a complete pedigree for Fox Terriers exists. Three dogs, known as Old Jock, Trap and Tartar, are the ancestors of most modern strains of white terrier. Old Jock was bred from a black and tan terrier, while Trap was from the strain out of Reverend John "Jack" Russell's dogs. Russell would later have the Jack Russell Terrier series of breeds named after him. Although definitive history on Tartar is not known, he is also thought to have come from black and tan terrier stock. Of the female dogs from this period, Grove Nettle was the best known. In addition to those dogs, another named Old Tip is thought to be the forefather of the modern Wire Fox Terrier.

The terrier of this period was short of leg, built in a chunky fashion, and had a skull that was broad across the top. Used in hunting packs and kept in kennels along with English Foxhounds, they were bred for their ability to drive the fox out of its den. Gradually the pace of the hunt became faster, and the terriers were bred with longer legs for more speed towards the end of the 18th century. However the increased size meant that the Fox Terrier became too big to be used for its original purpose, and its use in fox hunting began to decline.

The Fox Terrier Club of England was founded in 1876, with the American Fox Terrier Club following nine years later, becoming the first breed speciality club to become a member of the American Kennel Club. A female Smooth Fox Terrier bred by Winthrop Rutherfurd named Warren Remedy was the first winner of Best in Show at the Westminster Kennel Club Dog Show in 1907, 1908, and 1909. Following the popularity of conformation dog shows, the Fox Terrier was the result of selective breeding. For instance, by 1949, 120 of 140 Wire Fox Terrier champions were descended from a single championship-winning dog.

Modern breeds

There are two main breeds of Fox Terrier, Smooth and Wire, both of which originate in England. In addition, there are several descendant breeds which have been developed in a variety of countries. For example, the American Toy Fox Terrier was developed from the Smooth Fox Terrier, Italian Greyhound, Manchester Terrier, Miniature Pinscher and Chihuahua breeds.

Both major types of Fox Terrier are mostly white with coloured markings and have similar facial characteristics. They are essentially the same except for differences in coats, and slight differences in colouration and markings. Markings on either type can appear black at birth on the head, but may lighten in adult life, the most common colours being tan and black. The markings are a type of piebald spotting. Although the two main breeds were originally commonly interbred, this no longer occurs in pure-bred lines.

The Fox Terrier has been more successful than any other breed at the Westminster Kennel Club Dog Show, with four Best in Show titles going to the Smooth Fox Terrier and fourteen titles going to the Wire Fox Terrier. They were both shown as one breed with two coat variations; this changed in 1985 when the American Kennel Club listed the two as separate breeds. In the UK, at Crufts, the Smooth Fox Terrier has not won any Best in Show titles, while the Wire Fox Terrier has won on three occasions.

Smooth Fox Terrier

The Smooth Fox Terrier has a short, hard coat which is predominantly white. The head of this breed is long and wedge shaped, with small, dark eyes and ears that are v-shaped.

The breed has been identified as one of several Vulnerable Native Breeds in the UK. This is when there are fewer than 300 annual registrations with The Kennel Club. In 2010, there were 155 Smooth Fox Terriers registered, compared to 693 for the Wire Fox Terrier and 8,663 for the most popular breed in the Terrier Group, the Staffordshire Bull Terrier.

The most successful dog at the Westminster Kennel Club Dog Show was Ch. Warren Remedy, who won the Best in Show title three times between 1907 and 1909. These victories were followed by a further Best in Show title for Ch. Sabine Rarebit in 1910. Despite the Smooth Fox Terrier breed winning the first four Best in Show titles at Westminster, it has not won again since.

Wire Fox Terrier

The Wire Haired Fox Terrier has a hard and crisp double coat with a coarse texture underneath that provides protection from the cold. It should be so dense that the skin cannot be seen or felt. The individual hairs should twist, but are not curly. It has similar features to the Smooth Fox Terrier with small dark eyes and v-shaped ears. Its body is shorter than it is tall.

King Edward VII owned a Wire Fox Terrier from the Notts kennel called Caesar of Notts, which did a great deal to popularise the breed at the turn of the 20th century. Another member of the Notts kennel was an early winner of Best Champion at Crufts in 1911 named Collarbone of Notts. Other individual dogs which greatly influenced the breed included Ch. Talavera Simon, born in 1924, and Ch. Zeloy Emperor, born in 1960.

Descendant breeds

Common health issues
Myasthenia gravis, a neuromuscular disease, is inheritable in the Smooth Fox Terrier through an autosomal recessive gene. This can also be a symptom of megaesophagus, which is a health issue for the Wire Fox Terrier. Another inheritable condition in the Smooth Fox Terrier is cataracts, which is more prevalent than average in the breed. Both types of Fox Terrier can be susceptible to allergies.

In a survey conducted by The Kennel Club, the primary cause of death for Fox Terriers was old age, causing 31.8% of reported deaths. The secondary cause was cancer of an unspecified type, which accounted for 22.7% of reports. The average lifespan of a Fox Terrier is around 15 years; the Kennel Club survey reported a median age at death of 13 years and 2 months.

References
Specific

General

External links

Dog breeds originating in the United Kingdom
Dog types
Terriers